Stichophthalma louisa is a species of butterfly in the family Nymphalidae. It is found in Asia.

Subspecies
Stichophthalma louisa louisa
Stichophthalma louisa eamesi Monastyrskii, Devyatkin & Uemura, 2000
Stichophthalma louisa mathilda Janet, 1905 (southern Yunnan)
Stichophthalma louisa ranohngensis Okano, 1985
Stichophthalma louisa siamensis Rothschild, 1916
Stichophthalma louisa tytleri Rothschild, 1918

References

External links
 Stichophthalma louisa at the Encyclopedia of Life

Butterflies described in 1877
Amathusiini
Butterflies of Indochina